Alamuchee Creek is a stream in the U.S. states of Alabama and Mississippi. It is a tributary to the Sucarnoochee River.

Alamuchee most likely is a name derived from the Choctaw language meaning roughly "hiding place". Variant names are "Alamucha Creek", "Alamutchee Creek", "Allamucha Creek", "Allamuchee Creek", "Allamuchy Creek", "Allimucha Creek", and "Allimuchee Creek".

Tributaries include Little Alamuchee Creek.

References

Rivers of Alabama
Rivers of Sumter County, Alabama
Rivers of Mississippi
Rivers of Lauderdale County, Mississippi
Alabama placenames of Native American origin
Mississippi placenames of Native American origin